Tacoronte-Acentejo is a Spanish Denominación de Origen Protegida (DOP) for wines located in the Anaga Peninsula on the northeastern coast of the island of Tenerife (Canary Islands, Spain). It was the first region in the Canary Islands to acquire DO status, in 1992. It covers the municipalities of Santa Cruz de Tenerife, San Cristóbal de La Laguna, El Rosario, Tegueste, Tacoronte, El Sauzal, La Matanza de Acentejo, La Victoria de Acentejo and Santa Úrsula.

Covering around 1,000 ha, it is the largest DOP on Tenerife and represents 40% of the total cultivated land area and 20% of the vineyards of the island.

Geography
The vineyards are located at elevations of between 100 m and 1,000 m above sea level. They are planted on terraces on very steep hillsides facing north and looking over the sea.

Soils
The vines are planted in very fertile soil which is reddish. The soil is poor in carbonates but rich in organic matter and minerals, especially nitrogen, potassium and phosphorus. The subsoil is volcanic in origin.

Climate
The Atlantic Ocean provides a humid climate with mild temperatures and frequent mists. It is basically a Mediterranean climate influenced by the orientation of the island and the steel slopes, which gives rise to a great variety of microclimates. The prevailing trade winds are mild and humid.

Frost is unknown on the island, but hail, strong winds and occasional heatwaves represent risks for grape-growers.

Authorised Grape Varieties
The authorised grape varieties are:
 Red: Listán Negro, Negramoll,  Malvasía Rosada, Castellana Negra, Moscatel Negro, Cabernet Sauvignon, Merlot, Pinot Noir, Ruby Cabernet, Syrah, Tempranillo, Bastardo Tinto, Listán Prieto, Vijariego Negro
 White: Gual, Malvasía Volcánica, Malvasía Aromática, Doradilla, Bermejuela, Verdello, Moscatel de Alejandría, Vijariego, Forastera Blanca, Albillo, Sabro, Listán Blanco, Pedro Ximénez, Torrontés, Bastardo Blanco, Breval, Burrablanca

Traditionally the vines were planted as low bushes (en vaso) though newly planted vineyards tend to be on trellises (en espaldera). The maximum authorized planting density is 3,000 vines/ha. In practice, the yield is significantly lower than the authorised maximum.

References

External links
 D.O.P. Tacoronte-Acentejo official website

Wine regions of Spain
Spanish wine
Appellations
Wine classification
Canary Islands cuisine
Tenerife